Yona Kesse (1907 – 27 June 1985) was an Israeli politician who served as a member of the Knesset between 1949 and 1965.

Biography
Born in Dobre in the Russian Empire (today in Ukraine), Kesse was educated at a heder. During his youth, he frequented the home of Rabbi Menachem Mendel Schneerson. His parents died in the Holodomor in 1921. He was a member of HeHalutz, which was an illegal organisation in Russia, and in 1925 he was arrested for Zionist activities. The following year he made aliyah to Mandatory Palestine.

Kesse joined Hapoel Hatzair, and in 1932 became secretary of Rehovot Workers Council.  Between 1933 and 1936 he was a member of the Kfar Bilu moshav, before joining Kvutzat Shiller in 1936. A member of the Histadrut trade union's education centre, he was also a member of the Haganah's regional command in the south of Palestine. In 1938, he became secretary of Mapai, also holding the position between 1939 and 1940, and again from 1953 until 1956.

In 1949, he was elected to the first Knesset on the Mapai list. He was re-elected in 1951, 1955, 1959 and 1961. On 22 December 1964, he resigned from Mapai and became an independent MK; his attempt at forming a single-member faction by the name of Min HaYesod, being rejected by the House Committee.

He lost his seat in the 1965 elections. He died in 1985.

References

External links

1907 births
1985 deaths
People from Kherson Governorate
Jews from the Russian Empire
Ukrainian Jews
Soviet emigrants to Mandatory Palestine
Mapai politicians
Haganah members
Israeli trade unionists
Soviet Jews
Members of the 1st Knesset (1949–1951)
Members of the 2nd Knesset (1951–1955)
Members of the 3rd Knesset (1955–1959)
Members of the 4th Knesset (1959–1961)
Members of the 5th Knesset (1961–1965)